The Zeitenwende speech was an address delivered to the Bundestag by Olaf Scholz, the Chancellor of Germany, on 27 February 2022. His speech was a reaction to the 2022 Russian invasion of Ukraine on 24 February. Scholz described the attack as a "historic turning point" (literally: times-turn) and announced that in response his government would use a €100 billion fund to significantly increase military spending, reversing Germany's previously cautious defence policy.

Scholz's speech was well received by most German and international politicians, and was endorsed by the leader of the opposition Friedrich Merz. Newspapers praised the speech's policy content with The Economist crediting it with facilitating the modification of long-held positions in politics and society. Patrick Wintour of The Guardian wrote that Scholz had announced a "180-degree course correction".

Background 
In the early months of 2022, Russia built up a military presence of around 150,000 troops near the Ukrainian border while demanding a commitment from the Western military alliance NATO that Ukraine would not be admitted to its membership. Western governments rejected this demand and reacted by increasing their military aid to Ukraine. Germany, whose government was led by the recently elected chancellor Olaf Scholz, was criticised for taking a cautious approach to the crisis. The criticism focused on Scholz's refusal to specify whether certification of Nord Stream 2, a gas pipeline financed by the Russian energy corporation Gazprom, would be suspended in the event of a Russian attack on Ukraine. On 15 February, Scholz met the Russian President Vladimir Putin for talks in Moscow. Scholz's visit was interpreted by some commentators as a sign of German weakness towards Russia. On 22 February, Scholz announced that his government would prevent the pipeline's certification after Putin ordered troops into eastern Ukraine.

On 24 February 2022, Russia launched an invasion of Ukraine from its built-up positions in southern Russia and Belarus. The invasion was described by Putin as a "special military operation" to aid the Donetsk People's Republic and the Luhansk People's Republic, two separatist territories in Ukraine's Donbas region that had requested Russia's help. Western leaders harshly condemned the attack.

Speech on 27 February 
On 27 February, Scholz addressed the Bundestag, Germany's lower house of parliament, to outline his government's reaction to Russia's invasion of Ukraine. He announced a fundamental restructuring of the country's cautious defence policy: Scholz vowed to set up an extraordinary fund of €100 billion to be invested in the modernisation of the German armed forces, the Bundeswehr. He also promised that defence spending would exceed 2% of gross domestic product (GDP), a requirement of NATO membership that Scholz's Social Democratic Party of Germany (SPD) had traditionally opposed. Scholz justified his departure from established defence policy with the threat posed by Russia to peace in Europe. He described the new political situation on the continent as a "historic turning point" , literally: times-turn), saying:

We are living through a watershed era. And that means that the world afterwards will no longer be the same as the world before. The issue at the heart of this is whether power is allowed to prevail over the law. Whether we permit Putin to turn back the clock to the nineteenth century and the age of the great powers. Or whether we have it in us to keep warmongers like Putin in check. That requires strength of our own.

Policy changes and actions 
In addition to increases in German budgetary allotments for defence spending to achieve the 2% of GDP target mentioned in Scholz' speech, by September 2022, Germany had sent "30 Gepard anti-aircraft tanks, 10 Panzerhaubitze 2000 howitzers and three MARS multiple rocket launchers, as well as various lighter weapons," to support Ukraine. However, the government continued to delay the provision of heavy weapons, resisting opposition pressure to provide German-made Leopard battle tanks and Marder infantry fighting vehicles. On 5 January 2023, Scholz partially reversed this policy: he issued a joined press release with Joe Biden, the President of the United States, announcing that their countries would supply Ukraine with Marders and Bradley Fighting Vehicles respectively. Scholz also committed to sending a Patriot air defence system as a reaction to Russia's continued attacks on Ukraine's critical infrastructure.

During the early weeks of 2023, pressure increased on the German government to approve the supply of Leopard battle tanks. After Poland stated that it would submit a request to export 14 Leopard tanks to Ukraine, the government's spokesperson announced on 25 January that Germany would grant export requests from other states and that 14 Leopards would be sent to Ukraine from the inventory of the German armed forces.

Reception 

The speech was received positively by most German and international politicians. The Bundestag passed a motion of condemnation against the Russian government with the support of all parties except The Left and Alternative for Germany (AfD). Friedrich Merz, the leader of the opposition Christian Democratic Union of Germany (CDU), vowed to support Scholz's defence agenda, while he characterised the previous attitude of the chancellor's party as pro-Russian. Robert Habeck, the Minister for Economic Affairs, endorsed the new policy and admitted to mistakes in Germany's previous assessment of Russia. Jens Stoltenberg, Secretary General of NATO, praised Germany's new commitment to collective security, describing Scholz's promises as "a significant investment in security and freedom for our nations". According to a poll, 78% of Germans supported the proposed policies.

Even though the party shared Scholz's condemnation of Russia, the Left Party criticised the proposed increase in military spending. The party's chairwoman Amira Mohamed Ali accused the chancellor of engaging in an arms race that would prove detrimental to international security. Alice Weidel of AfD contradicted Scholz and asserted that NATO had committed an "historic mistake" in "aggrieving Russia" by entertaining the possibility of Ukrainian membership. As Scholz resisted the transfer of heavy weaponry to Ukraine, parts of the governing coalition began challenging the chancellor in parliament.

Writing for The Guardian, Patrick Wintour described Scholz's proposals as a "180-degree course correction" and wrote that Germany had become "not just an economic but also a geopolitical powerhouse" overnight. Sergey Lagodinsky, a Member of the European Parliament, argued that, in addition to its increased military spending, Germany needed to learn how to wield military intervention as a tool of foreign policy. He considered the country's close energy ties with Russia "one of the biggest strategic mistakes of the past 20 years". In August 2022, The Economist credited the Zeitenwende speech with facilitating the modification of long-held positions in politics and society. The newspaper reckoned that Germany now had the potential to become a "country comfortable with asserting itself using its armed forces". It also linked Scholz's new defence agenda to a new energy policy that could see Germany become less dependent on Russian gas, a scenario it described as "one of Vladimir Putin's biggest [potential] regrets".

The term Zeitenwende became a political catchphrase in the aftermath of the speech and was chosen the German word of the year 2022.

Around the anniversary of the speech, some have criticized a perceived gap between Scholz's words and subsequent actions. Minister-President of Bavaria Markus Söder criticized Scholz by stating "everyone is talking about Zeitenwende, but so far we’ve only seen Zeitlupe [slow motion]". Matthew Karnitschnig of Politico commented that "it's become clear that the best way to describe Scholz's much-ballyhooed slogan is with a blunt Americanism: bullshit". Confronted with similar criticisms by CNN's Fareed Zakaria, Scholz emphasized Germany's aid to Ukraine and the successful decoupling from Russian energy dependence, while stating it "is absolutely clear we will go to two percent of GDP [in military spending]" and that starting necessary military production takes time.

Citations

Bibliography 

2022 speeches
February 2022 events in Germany
Foreign policy doctrines
German foreign policy
Military history of Germany
Olaf Scholz
Reactions to the 2022 Russian invasion of Ukraine
Social Democratic Party of Germany